is a lava dome located in the Daisetsuzan Volcanic Group of the Ishikari Mountains, Hokkaido, Japan.

See also
 List of volcanoes in Japan
 List of mountains in Japan

References
 Geographical Survey Institute

Mountains of Hokkaido
Volcanoes of Hokkaido
Lava domes